Alejandro San Francisco is a Chilean historian. San Francisco was an advisor of Joaquín Lavín when he was minister of Education. Since 2014 he has also been a columnist for El Líbero, a libertarian online newspaper.

San Francisco was president of the Pontifical Catholic University of Chile Students Federation (FEUC).

On 9 January 2018, he was appointed as Chief of the Institute of History of San Sebastián University.

References

External links
 San Sebastián University Profile
 

1968 births
Living people
Chilean people
Chilean historians
Pontifical Catholic University of Chile alumni